The English rock group the Beatles toured the United States and Canada between 19 August and 20 September 1964. The 32 concerts comprised the second stage of a world tour that started with the band's tour of Europe, Hong Kong, and Australia and finished with their UK Autumn tour. The shows in the United States were a return to the country after their brief February 1964 tour.

Background
Following the Beatles' two week appearance in the United States in February 1964, the band became the most well known group in America. In the six months that followed they achieved 17 Top 40 singles – including six number ones. Their US only LPs A Hard Day's Night and Something New topped the charts for nine weeks. Their first film A Hard Day's Night earned $1.3 million in its first week. Fans in the United States excitedly anticipated a country-wide tour.

On 11 and 14 August the Beatles began recording sessions for what would become Beatles for Sale, their fourth studio album. They recorded four songs: "Baby's in Black", "I'm a Loser", "Leave My Kitten Alone" and "Mr. Moonlight". After these recordings, they departed London on 18 August at noon. After two brief stops in Winnipeg and Los Angeles, the group arrived at San Francisco International Airport on 19 August at 6:25 pm, greeted by 9,000 of their fans.

Repertoire, tour personnel and equipment
Supporting acts for the tour included the Bill Black Combo, the Exciters, the Righteous Brothers, Jackie DeShannon, Larry Lee and the Leesures (Las Vegas only) and Clarence "Frogman" Henry. For their concert repertoire, the Beatles chose only released songs, placing emphasis on ones where the recorded arrangement could be easily reproduced in live performance.

During shows George Harrison switched between his Gretsch Country Gentleman and Rickenbacker 12-string guitars, though he would sometimes play a different guitar than was used on the original studio recording. The Beatles used new 100-watt amplifiers for all their shows, though their sound was still consistently drowned out by the sound of screaming fans.

Journalist Larry Kane of WFUN in Miami joined the Beatles on their tour. Then 20 years old, Kane sent a letter to Beatles manager Brian Epstein requesting a one-time interview. Epstein responded by inviting him to travel with the group as part of the press party. Kane speculated that Epstein included him because he thought he was a well-known American personality that owned several radio stations.

United States and Canada

The tour encompassed 32 shows in 25 cities over 31 days. Most shows quickly sold-out, with attendance ranging from 4,000 (New York City) to 28,000 (Baltimore). For each show, the Beatles earned $50,000 minimum, earning over a million dollars across the entire tour.

Intense screaming and rabid fans characterized shows across the tour. Mobbing crowds necessitated enhanced security measures, including decoy limousines and for the Beatles to travel to and from shows in unlikely vehicles, such as delivery vans and ambulances. Variety reported that at the show in Vancouver 160 girls were treated for injuries and distress after thousands of fans charged at the security barriers in front of the stage. At shows in Cleveland and Kansas City fans broke past police lines to climb onto the stage. In both cases calm was only restored after Beatles press officer Derek Taylor threatened to cancel the rest of the concert.

In Montreal a newspaper reported that Ringo Starr had been threatened. Starr later speculated it was due to antisemitism and an incorrect assumption that he was Jewish. In light of the threat, the Beatles left immediately after their Montreal show for Jacksonville, Florida. Due to Hurricane Dora their flight diverted to Key West, landing at 3:30 am on 9 September. At their hotel Paul McCartney and John Lennon drank and talked emotionally late into the night.

Hollywood Bowl

During their first US visit, Capitol Records planned to record the Beatles' performance on 12 February 1964 at Carnegie Hall, New York City in order to make a live album for US release. The recording did not happen because the American Federation of Musicians refused to grant permission. When the Beatles returned to the US, Capitol still hoped to record and again requested permission of the Federation, this time receiving it. Martin and Capitol's Voyle Gilmore recorded the Beatles performing at the Hollywood Bowl on 23 August 1964. Executives rejected the recording for release due to its poor sound quality. Martin explained the audience's screaming was "like putting a microphone at the end of a 747 jet". The recording remained unreleased until the 1977 album The Beatles at the Hollywood Bowl where it is mixed together with two August 1965 performances.

New York and meeting Bob Dylan
While the Beatles stayed at Hotel Delmonico in New York City, New York Post writer Al Aronowitz introduced Bob Dylan to them on 28 August. The Beatles initially offered Dylan amphetamine pills but he said he preferred "cheap wine". Dylan suggested they instead smoke marijuana, something the Beatles had only tried a few times before. Starr, not knowing he was supposed to share it, smoked the entire marijuana joint himself. After rolling and smoking another joint, the Beatles laughed continuously while Dylan answered the constantly ringing telephone in the band's hotel suite saying, "This is Beatlemania here." McCartney became convinced he had discovered the meaning of life and asked Beatles roadie Mal Evans to write down his thoughts. McCartney recalls reading the paper the next morning with it saying "There are Seven Levels".

Lennon recalled the meeting in 1970: "When I met Dylan I was quite dumbfounded. I'm pretty much a fan type myself, in a way; I stopped being a 'fan' when I started doing it myself. I never went collecting people's autographs or any of that jive. But if I dig somebody, I really dig them." Dylan recalled in 1971: "I just kept it to myself that I really dug them. Everybody else thought they were for the teenyboppers, that they were gonna pass right away. But it was obvious to me that they had staying power."

Jacksonville and segregation concerns

The Beatles experienced difficulty in leaving the George Washington Hotel in Jacksonville. Around two dozen police officers escorted the group past 500 fans. It took 15 minutes for the group to travel the 25 feet from the hotel elevator to their waiting limousine.

In July 1964 US President Lyndon Johnson signed the Civil Rights Act prohibiting discrimination "on the basis of race, color, religion, sex, or national origin". The Beatles, opposed to racial segregation, remained concerned that their upcoming Jacksonville, Florida show could still be segregated. On 6 September – a week before the show – they issued a press statement saying, "We will not appear unless Negroes are allowed to sit anywhere". The following day Jacksonville's daily paper, The Florida Times-Union, released an editorial disparaging the Beatles. Entitled "Beatlemania Is A Mark Of A Frenetic Era", the piece described the group as "a passing fad, whose appearance on the scene was perfectly timed and fitted to the mores, morals and ideals of a fast-paced, troubled time." Though the editorial does not mention segregation, Beatles writer Bill DeMain interprets it as arguing that the Beatles were not intelligent enough to comment on social issues.

The Beatles performed at Gator Bowl Stadium on 11 September after receiving assurance from the promoter that the audience would not be segregated. Barry Miles writes that there were never plans to segregate the show. The Beatles initially refused to go on stage until newsreel and television cameramen were forced from the arena.

Kansas City

During the tour, millionaire Charlie Finley, owner of the Kansas City Athletics baseball team, offered the Beatles a large sum to perform an extra show in Kansas City. With few days off, the Beatles rejected the initial offer, accepting only after it increased to $150,000 (equivalent to $ million in ), a higher figure than any American artist had ever received for a single show.

On 17 September, the Beatles played in Kansas City's Municipal Stadium to around 20,000 spectators, roughly half the stadium's capacity. Breaking with their trend of only playing released material, they covered "Kansas City"/"Hey, Hey, Hey, Hey" to what Beatles historian Mark Lewisohn writes was "an especially uproarious reception". The Thursday night show was a net loss for Finley, though he explained afterwards, "I don't consider it any loss at all. The Beatles were brought here for the enjoyment of the children in this area and watching them last night they had complete enjoyment."

Return to New York
The Beatles performed a charity concert in New York City on 20 September. Titled "An Evening With The Beatles", the show aided the United Cerebral Palsy of New York City and Retarded Infants Services.

Legacy

Writer June Skinner Sawyers describes the tour as "the first major rock-and-roll concert tour in the history of popular music". 

In response to Larry Kane asking if there was anything he cherished about the tour, Lennon replied: "Well, just the whole thing. It's been fantastic. We will probably never do another tour like it. It could never be the same as this one and it's probably something we will remember the rest of our days. It's just been marvelous."

The Beatles returned to North America in 1965 and 1966.

Set list
According to Walter Everett (lead singers appear in parenthesis):
"Twist and Shout" (abbreviated) (John Lennon) or "I Saw Her Standing There" (Paul McCartney)
"You Can't Do That" (Lennon)
"All My Loving" (McCartney)
"She Loves You" (Lennon and McCartney)
"Things We Said Today" (abbreviated) (McCartney)
"Roll Over Beethoven" (George Harrison)
"Can't Buy Me Love" (McCartney)
"If I Fell" (Lennon)
"I Want to Hold Your Hand" (Lennon and McCartney) 
"Boys" (Ringo Starr)
"A Hard Day's Night" (Lennon with McCartney)
"Long Tall Sally" (McCartney) or "Twist and Shout" (Lennon)

During one of the 19 August Daly City shows the Beatles added "Till There Was You" (McCartney) and on 17 September in Kansas City played "Kansas City"/"Hey, Hey, Hey, Hey" (McCartney).

Tour dates
According to Mark Lewisohn and Walter Everett:

See also
 List of the Beatles' live performances

Notes

References

Sources

 
 
 
 
 
 
 
 
 
 
 
 
 
 
 
 
 
 

1964 concert tours
1964 North America
Concert tours of Canada
Concert tours of the United States
1964 in the United States
August 1964 events in Canada
September 1964 events in Canada 
August 1964 events in the United States
September 1964 events in the United States